Singularis may refer to :
 singularis, singular, or singular number, a grammatical number
In biology:
Dypsis singularis, a species of flowering plant in the family Arecaceae 
Mesocnemis singularis, a species of damselfly in the family Platycnemididae
Nesopupa singularis, a species of gastropod in the family Pupillidae
Pyrgomantis singularis, a species of praying mantis found in Kenya
Renea singularis, a species of gastropod in the family Aciculidae
Xenerpestes singularis, a species of bird in the family Furnariidae

Also a video by the natural philosophers with attitude that shows the different large scale networks organised along the principal gradient.